Worse than Alone is the fourth studio album by The Number Twelve Looks Like You. It was released on March 10, 2009 through Eyeball Records.  It was the final release by the band before their six-year break-up that started in January 2010.

On March 12, 2015 the album was re-released on limited edition, hand numbered cassettes.

Track listing

Personnel
The Number Twelve Looks Like You
 Jesse Korman – vocals
 Justin Pedrick – vocals
 Alexis Pareja – guitar
 Chris Russell – bass
 Jon Karel – drums
Production
 Produced by The Number Twelve Looks Like You
 Mixed by Steve Evetts

References

2009 albums
The Number Twelve Looks Like You albums